The Blarney Stone (also known as The Blarney Kiss) is a 1933 British comedy film directed by and starring Tom Walls. It also features Anne Grey, Robert Douglas, Zoe Palmer and Peter Gawthorne. The screenplay concerns a penniless Irishman who becomes the business partner of an English aristocrat with a penchant for high-stakes gambling.

The film was made at British and Dominion's Elstree Studios.

Cast
 Tom Walls as Tim Fitzgerald
 Anne Grey as Lady Anne Cranton
 Robert Douglas as Lord Breethorpe
 W.G. Fay as The Leader
 J.A. O'Rourke as Sir Arthur
 George Barret
 Robert Horton
 Haidee Wright as Countess Eleanor
 Dorothy Tetley as Muriel Atkins
 Louis Bradfield as Mackintosh
 Zoe Palmer as Diana
 Charles Carson as Sir Arthur
 Peter Gawthorne
 Dickie Edwards as Tim Fitzgerald Jnr

References

Bibliography
 Low, Rachael. Filmmaking in 1930s Britain. George Allen & Unwin, 1985.
 Wood, Linda. British Films, 1927-1939. British Film Institute, 1986.

External links
The Blarney Kiss at IMDB

1933 films
1933 comedy films
British comedy films
Films directed by Tom Walls
British black-and-white films
British and Dominions Studios films
Films shot at Imperial Studios, Elstree
1930s English-language films
1930s British films